Tylee Ashlyn Ryan (September 24, 2002 –  September 9, 2019) and Joshua Jaxon "J. J." Vallow (May 25, 2012 –  September 23, 2019) were two American children from Chandler, Arizona, who disappeared in September 2019 and whose remains were found buried in shallow graves on June 9, 2020 in Rexburg, Idaho, in their stepfather Chad Daybell's backyard. Tylee was last seen alive at Yellowstone National Park on September 8, 2019. Her younger adopted brother, J.J., was last seen alive on September 23, 2019, at Rexburg's Kennedy Elementary School. He was initially reported missing by relatives concerned about not only the children—whom they had not heard from in weeks—but also several other suspicious incidents.

In November 2019, police questioned the children's mother, Lori (Cox) Yanes Lagioia Ryan Vallow Daybell, about the children's whereabouts and welfare. Lori and her new fifth husband, Chad Guy Daybell, claimed that J.J. was staying with family friend Melanie Gibb in Arizona, where they had lived before moving to Idaho in early September 2019, which Gibb later denied. Police efforts to locate J.J. led to the discovery that Tylee was also missing.

Complicating circumstances around the disappearances was a string of suspicious deaths. Lori's estranged 4th husband, Charles Vallow, was shot and killed in July 2019 by Lori's brother, Alexander Cox, who claimed self-defense; Cox died of a blood clot on December 12, 2019. In early October 2019, Brandon Boudreaux, the then-estranged husband of Lori's niece, Melani, was shot at in the driveway of his Gilbert, Arizona, home from a vehicle still registered to the deceased Charles Vallow. In October 2019, Chad's wife, Tammy Daybell, was attacked in her driveway by what she believed was someone shooting a defective paintball gun. A few weeks later, on October 19, she died in her sleep from what was initially recorded as "natural causes". No post-mortem or autopsy was initially performed. After Chad and Lori's marriage two weeks after Tammy's death, law enforcement became suspicious and exhumed Tammy's corpse for autopsy.

On February 20, 2020, Lori was arrested in Kauai, Hawaii, and charged with desertion and nonsupport of her dependent children. She was extradited to Idaho and transported there by officials on March 5, 2020. On June 9, 2020, police executed a search warrant at Chad's home and discovered the remains of J.J. and Tylee. Chad was arrested later that day on charges of destruction or concealment of evidence. On May 25, 2021, Lori and Chad were charged with the first degree murders of Tylee, J.J., and Tammy.

Background

Chad Daybell

Chad Guy Daybell (born August 11, 1968, Provo, Utah) married Tamara "Tammy" Douglas (May 4, 1970 – October 19, 2019) in Manti, Utah, on March 9, 1990. He graduated from Brigham Young University (BYU) in 1992 with a B.A. in journalism, and worked as a cemetery sexton, or gravedigger, among other jobs. In 2004, Chad founded Spring Creek Book Company, which he used to self-publish his end times fiction and other religious books. His partner in this venture was a man identified in media only by the name Douglas, a graphic artist and manager. Chad and Tammy had five children: Garth, Emma, Seth, Leah, and Mark.

In 2015, Chad claimed he heard a voice telling him to relocate to Rexburg, Idaho. He and Tammy moved there from Springville, Utah, that June.

Death of Tammy Daybell 
On October 9, 2019, Tammy reported on her Facebook profile and to police that she had been shot at, in her driveway, by a masked man with what she believed was a defective paintball marker. The county sheriff's office did not find the perpetrator. Ten days later, Tammy was found dead in her home, purportedly from natural causes. Chad claimed that she had retired the night before "with a terrible cough" and died in her sleep.

No post-mortem or autopsy was performed on Tammy's body at the time, as Chad had declined to do so and the county coroner did not overrule his decision. Two months later, Tammy's body was exhumed and autopsied. The results were completed by February 2021 but have not been made public. 

Shortly after, the Fremont County prosecutor's office announced they would be handling the case going forward. In a subsequent interview, one of Tammy and Chad's children, Emma, said that her family has not been contacted regarding the results of her mother's autopsy.

Lori Vallow Daybell

Lori Ryan Daybell, also referred to as Lori Vallow Daybell, was born Lori Norene Cox on June 26, 1973, in San Bernardino, California. In 1992, at the age of 19, she married high school boyfriend Nelson Yanes, but the marriage ended in divorce shortly afterwards. At age 22, she married 23-year-old William Lagioia in Travis County, Texas, on October 22, 1995. She and Lagioia had a son, Colby, in 1996 (who was later arrested on two counts of sexual assault in Arizona in 2022, charges that were later dropped without prejudice), before divorcing on February 25, 1998.

Marriage to Joseph Anthony Ryan Jr. 
In 2001, Lori married Joseph Anthony Ryan Jr., who legally adopted Colby. The couple's biological daughter, Tylee, was born in 2002. Ryan filed for divorce on August 13, 2004, which was finalized on May 18, 2005. In 2007, Ryan was attacked by Lori's brother, Alexander Lamar "Alex" Cox, who claimed Ryan had been abusive to Lori and the children. Cox tasered Ryan and threatened to murder him. He pled guilty and was sentenced to 90 days in jail, which he served in Austin, Texas.

Cox (who changed his surname to Pastenes, the surname of his wife) died on December 12, 2019. His death was attributed to blood clots and high blood pressure.

Marriage to Charles Vallow 
On February 24, 2006, Lori married Leland Anthony Vallow (August 17, 1956, Calcasieu, Louisiana – July 11, 2019, Chandler, Arizona), commonly known as Charles Vallow, in Las Vegas, Nevada. Vallow, a lifelong Catholic, became a member of the Church of Jesus Christ of Latter-day Saints (LDS), converting to his new wife's faith. Vallow had two sons from a previous marriage, Nicholas and Zachary Chase. In 2013, the couple adopted Vallow's grandnephew, Joshua Jaxon "J.J." Vallow (born 2012), and in late 2014, they moved to Kauai, Hawaii.

Around 2015, Lori read Chad Daybell's Standing in Holy Places series of books, reportedly becoming "obsessed" with them. In 2016, the Vallow family moved back to Arizona. In the fall of 2018, Lori and her friend Melanie Gibb attended a "Preparing a People" event, where Lori was introduced to Chad for the first time. According to Gibb, by the end of the weekend, Chad told Lori the two had been married in seven previous lifetimes. The two soon began a private communication.

Several weeks after their initial meeting, Lori's husband left town on a business trip and Lori held an intimate overnight gathering at her home. In attendance were both Gibb and Chad, who was speaking at another conference in Mesa, Arizona. Gibb later recalled Chad lavishing attention on Lori and expounding upon his unusual religious beliefs and "the deeper mysteries of God" with a small group of the overnight guests. According to Gibb, Chad stated that he had lived 31 different lives on various earth-like planets. He referred to others as “light” or "dark" and various gradations in between. Chad believed the "Dark" individuals were from this earth but were followers of Satan. Those who were "light" were "followers of Jesus Christ". Chad Daybell referred to Lori as an "eternal being" of 21 separate lives, only five of which had occurred on this planet; the same five he had lived on this planet. Lori was both thrilled and attracted to this belief system and became increasingly fixated on this newfound "purpose" and on Chad.

On December 5, 2018, Chad and Lori appeared together on the Preparing a People podcast episode "Time to Warrior Up". Chad later stayed at the Vallow residence in Arizona. By February 2019, according to Charles Vallow, Lori was informing him that "she no longer cared about him or J.J." and claimed that she was the reincarnated wife of LDS founder Joseph Smith, then vanished for 58 days. The same month, Charles filed for divorce, stating that his wife had  to murder him", taken US$35,000 from their joint bank accounts, and stolen his truck. He filed for an order of protection against Lori at the advice of his attorney, citing a "genuine fear for his life".

After Charles' death, his attorneys stated he was primarily concerned for J.J.'s safety and well-being, as he needed a consistent routine due to his special needs. Charles was also concerned for Tylee, but he was unable to include her in the filings as she was not his biological daughter and thus he had no legal standing. He withdrew the petition one month later, saying he "wanted to try to make the marriage work".

Killing of Charles Vallow 
On July 11, 2019, Charles Vallow was shot and killed in Chandler, Arizona by Lori's brother, Alex Cox, who claimed self-defense. Cox alleged that he went to confront Charles about abusing his sister, whereupon "Charles Vallow struck him in the head with the bat, so he went to get his gun." Police did not pursue the matter further. Both J.J. and Tylee had witnessed the incident; according to an unidentified son of Charles' from a previous marriage, Lori did not inform the family about the shooting and he learned about it from the news. Lori was indicted in June 2021 for conspiracy to murder Charles.

End of times religious beliefs 
Another factor contributing to the mystery was Chad and Lori's well-documented obsession with certain Mormon-influenced apocalyptic beliefs, which Chad had discussed in numerous books and podcasts. Melani Boudreaux, Lori's niece, reportedly shares these beliefs.

Disappearance of Tylee and J.J.
, a doorbell video of J.J. playing with a friend is the last known video of him taken. His last confirmed sighting was at Rexburg's Kennedy Elementary School. On September 24, 2019, Lori contacted the school to tell them that she was withdrawing J.J. from classes, claiming she would be homeschooling him. Tylee was last seen September 8, 2019, at Yellowstone National Park with her brother J.J., her mother Lori, and her uncle Alex Cox, Lori's brother.

In October 2019, two Venmo payments were made from Tylee's account to her older half-brother, Colby Ryan. One payment was sent on October 10, with a message that read "we love you", and the second payment was sent on October 16, with a heart emoji. Colby has said he had not heard from Tylee since these texts. After text-messaging Tylee indicating he was worried, he received responses from Tylee's cell phone that indicated she was safe but too busy to talk. After repeated calls to Tylee went unanswered, Colby became more worried.

Chad Daybell and Lori Vallow's marriage and flight
Chad and Lori were married in Hawaii on November 5, 2019, two weeks after the death of Chad's first wife, Tammy Daybell. There they told others that Tylee had died in 2017 and/or that Lori had no minor children. Back in Rexburg, on November 26, police visited Lori's townhouse at the request of J.J.'s grandmother, Kay Woodcock, to conduct a welfare check on J.J. Lori told police that J.J. was in Arizona with a family friend, Melanie Gibb. That night, a neighbor saw Lori and Alex Cox packing a truck outside her home. When police reached Gibb by phone, she told police that J.J. was not with her and had not been there for several months. When Rexburg police and the FBI arrived the next day to search the home, it was abandoned. Chad's home was also searched by investigators.

More than a week later, Gibb called police saying that both Lori and Chad had asked her to lie to police about J.J.'s whereabouts but she refused. Police efforts to locate J.J. led to the discovery that Tylee was also missing. From December 2019 to January 2020, Rexburg police, the Fremont County sheriff's office, and the FBI intensified the investigation into the disappearances of the two children, as well as the investigation into Tammy's death and the flight of Chad and Lori from Idaho. Evidence was collected, and Tammy's body was exhumed for autopsy. Colby and J.J.'s grandparents pleaded with the Daybells to return the children, with the latter offering a reward of $20,000. Investigators contended that Joshua and Tylee's lives are in danger.', [...] the children are not with Chad and Lori. [... Lori] knows where they are or what has happened to them, but she has 'completely refused to assist this investigation, [choosing instead to leave the state with her new husband].

Through their lawyer, the Daybells stated that, "Chad Daybell was a loving husband and he has the support of his children in this matter. Lori Daybell is a devoted mother and she resents assertions to the contrary. We look forward to addressing the allegations once they have moved beyond speculation and rumor."

Storage locker
Authorities soon turned their attention to a Rexburg storage locker rented by Lori in October 2019. Inside they discovered items belonging to or associated with Tylee and J.J., such as clothing, bikes, and photographs, all of which had been abandoned when Lori suddenly left Rexburg at the end of November 2019. Video footage shows her and her brother, Alex Cox, moving items in and out of the locker prior to her departure.

Arrests and criminal charges 
On February 20, 2020, Lori was arrested by the Kauai Police Department in Princeville, Hawaii, and charged by prosecutors in Madison County, Idaho with two felony counts of desertion and nonsupport of dependent children. She was also charged with three misdemeanors: resisting or obstructing officers; criminal solicitation to commit a crime; and contempt of court. Lori was held on US$5 million bail. She later agreed to be extradited back to Idaho to fight the charges. The judge lowered her bail to $1 million. On May 1, 2020, Lori appeared for a court hearing in Rexburg to request a reduction of her $1 million bail. The judge denied her request. At least two local bond companies were reportedly unwilling to work with her.

On March 24, 2020, NBC News reported on documents showing that Chad and Lori became convinced that Tylee and J.J. were "possessed" and had become "zombies".

On June 9, 2020, police executed a search warrant at Chad's home, where they discovered human remains buried in a purported pet cemetery. Chad was booked into jail later that day on obstruction or concealment of evidence; he was later charged with felony murder. On June 10, his bail was set at $1 million. On July 2, prosecutors dropped two of the charges against Lori  two felony counts of desertion and nonsupport of dependent children  and instead charged her with obstruction or concealment of evidence in regards to her children's remains.

On July 17, 2020, in light of the two felony counts against Lori having been dropped, her bond was lowered by Madison County judge Michelle Mallard. Judge Mallard decided to decrease bond to US$50,000 on each charge, totaling US$150,000, but noted that Chad would still need to post US$1 million in neighboring Fremont County to get out of jail. In addition to the bond reduction, a jury trial for the Madison County charges against Lori was set for January 25–29, 2021. On May 25, 2021, Chad and Lori were indicted on the charge of conspiracy to commit first-degree murder, first-degree murder, and grand theft by deception for the deaths of Tylee, and J.J., and Tammy. Lori was charged with grand theft related to "Social Security Survivor benefits over $1,000 allocated for the care of minors Tylee Ryan and JJ Vallow that were appropriated after the children were missing and ultimately found deceased". Chad was charged with insurance fraud "related to a life insurance policy he had on Tammy Daybell for which he was the beneficiary and received funds after her death". On May 27, 2021, Lori was found incompetent and unfit to stand trial, and her case was stayed. She has since been deemed competent to stand trial after mental health treatment, incompetent, and again competent. Requests from Chad to separate his case from Lori's have been denied. A start date of January 2023 for both trials had been set, but was canceled in November 2022 without a new date being set.

Identification of remains
On June 10, 2020, the Woodcock and Ryan families confirmed that the human remains found on Chad's property were those of Tylee and J.J. This finding was officially confirmed by Rexburg police on June 13. Since the children's remains were found, they are no longer considered missing and the investigation is now focused on determining the circumstances surrounding their deaths.

Timeline

Notable early developments
March 9, 1990 — Chad Daybell and Tamara Douglas are married.
2001 — Lori Norene Cox marries Joseph Anthony Ryan Jr.
September 24, 2002 — Tylee Ryan is born to Lori and Joseph, who later divorce.
February 24, 2006 — Lori Ryan marries Charles Vallow.
2007 — Alex Cox (Lori's brother) attacks Joseph Ryan with a taser and threatens his life; Cox sentenced to 90 days in jail and 5 years of probation 
December 2011 — Alex Cox's probation ends more than one year before it was originally scheduled to end (May 2013).
May 25, 2012 — Joshua Jaxon "J.J." Vallow is born, the son of Charles Vallow's nephew. His birth name was Canaan Todd Trahan.

July 2014 to February 2019
July 2014 — Lori and Charles officially adopt Joshua Jaxon "J.J." Vallow.
End of 2014 — Charles and Lori move to Kauai, Hawaii, with Tylee and J.J.
Mid-2017 — The Vallows move to Arizona.
April 3, 2018 — Joseph Ryan dies of apparent heart attack.
December 5, 2018 — Chad Daybell and Lori Vallow meet.
February 2019 to March 2019 — Lori Vallow disappears for 58 days. 
February 8, 2019 — Charles Vallow files for divorce from Lori. In the filing, Charles claims that, in late January 2019, Lori threatened to murder him if he got in the way of her preparations for Christ's second coming in July 2020.

July 2019 to August 2019
July 11, 2019 — Charles Vallow is shot dead in Chandler, Arizona, by Lori's brother, Alex Cox, who claims self-defense. Local police close the case.
July 12, 2019 — Lori Vallow notifies Charles' sons from another marriage of his death via text message. She repeatedly dodges their questions regarding his cause of death.
July 2019 — Days after Charles Vallow's death, Lori learns her late husband had changed the beneficiary of his million-dollar life insurance policy from Lori to his sister, Kay Woodcock, who is also J.J.'s paternal grandmother.
August 10, 2019 — The last time grandparents Larry and Kay Woodcock reportedly speak with J.J.
August 30, 2019 — Lori returns J.J.'s service dog, citing "a change in life circumstances".

September 2019 to November 2019
September 2019 — Lori, with Tylee, and J.J., moves to Rexburg, Idaho, to be with Chad Daybell.
September 8, 2019 — Tylee is last seen in Yellowstone National Park, along with Lori, Alex and J.J. 
September 23, 2019 — J.J. is last seen at his new school, Kennedy Elementary in Rexburg, Idaho.
September 24, 2019 — Lori informs J.J.'s school that he will no longer be attending and will be homeschooled instead. 
October 1, 2019 — Lori rents storage locker in Rexburg in which children's belongings are later found.
October 2, 2019 — Brandon Boudreaux, Lori Vallow's nephew-in-law, is the target of a failed drive-by shooting in Gilbert, Arizona, by someone driving a green Jeep Cherokee still registered to Charles Vallow.
October 9, 2019 — Tamara "Tammy" Daybell calls police after a masked assailant attempted to shoot her in her garage with what she believed was a paintball gun.
The death was initially ruled to be due to "natural causes," but, as of February 11, 2020, was reopened and under investigation.
October 2019 — Lori's brother, Alex Cox, believed to be seen on video security footage using Lori's storage unit numerous times during this period, usually alone.
October 31/November 1, 2019 — Alex Cox and Lori's niece, Melani Boudreaux, reportedly seen by Melani's ex-husband, Brandon Boudreaux, packing up in Chandler, Arizona, "before driving up to Rexburg," and discarding children's items on the curb. Some of the information comes from a private investigator hired by Brandon Boudreaux after the October 2 shooting.
November 4, 2019 — Alex Cox and Melani Boudreaux arrive in Rexburg.
November 5, 2019 — Lori Vallow marries Chad Daybell in Hawaii.
November 26, 2019 — Rexburg Police Department conducts a well-being check on J.J. Lori claims J.J. is with relatives in Arizona and Tylee is away at Brigham Young University-Idaho.
November 27, 2019 — Chad and Lori are seen packing. They abandon everything in Rexburg, including the contents of Lori's storage unit, and disappear until found in Kauai in late January.
November 27, 2019 — Rexburg police search for children, to no avail, with search warrants to the three apartments of Lori Vallow Daybell, Alex Cox (aka Alex Pastenes) and Melani Boudreaux.
November 29, 2019 — Alex Cox marries Zulema Pastenes of Gilbert, Arizona in Las Vegas.
November 30, 2019 — Newly divorced Melani Boudreaux marries Ian Pawlowski of Rexburg in Las Vegas, one day after Alex Cox (Melani's uncle) wed Zulema Pastenes. Cox legally changed his name to Alex Pastenes just before his marriage.

December 2019 to March 2020
December 11, 2019 — Authorities decide to further investigate the death of Tammy Daybell.
December 12, 2019 — Alex Cox dies in Gilbert, Arizona. A 911 call is made by someone who identifies Alex as their mother's "boyfriend" and to report his collapse in the bathroom of the home of his new wife, Zulema Pastenes. His death is later attributed by autopsy to natural causes, i.e. blood clots and high blood pressure.
December 20, 2019 — Rexburg Police Department officially announce an investigation into the disappearances of Tylee and J.J.
January 3, 2020 — Rexburg Police Department and FBI search Chad and Tammy's former home in Idaho.
January 25, 2020 — Local authorities locate Chad Daybell and Lori Vallow in Kauai, Hawaii and serve Lori with court order requiring her to produce the children within five days.
January 30, 2020 — Lori misses court-ordered deadline to produce J.J. and Tylee.
February 10, 2020 — CBS News reports police found Tylee's cell phone with Lori's belongings in Hawaii.
February 20, 2020 — Lori Vallow is arrested in Kauai and charged with two felony counts of desertion and nonsupport of dependent children.
February 24, 2020 — In child custody court documents, Brandon Boudreaux says that Ian Pawlowski told law enforcement that Melani conspired with her uncle Alex Cox to kill Brandon. Brandon also alleges in these papers that police are investigating Melani's role in the disappearance of the children as well as Brandon's shooting.
February 26, 2020 — In extradition hearing, judge refuses to lower Lori's $5 million bail. She remains incarcerated in Kauai awaiting extradition to Idaho.
March 6, 2020 — In first hearing after being extradited from Hawaii to Idaho, court lowers bail from $5 million to $1 million.
March 9, 2020 — Lori remains in jail, and some local bail bond companies reportedly have refused to assist her.

June 2020 to August 2020
June 9, 2020 — Human remains are found on Chad Daybell's property in Salem, Idaho. Daybell is arrested later that day. He is charged with two felony counts of "Destruction, Alteration or Concealment of Evidence" and held in the Fremont County Jail.
June 10, 2020 — Kay Woodcock, the biological grandmother of J.J. Vallow, announces that one of the sets of human remains belongs to J.J. Vallow. The Ryan family confirm that the second set of remains belong to Tylee Ryan. 
June 13, 2020 — Authorities officially confirm the remains are those of the children. Court documents later show that Tylee's body was dismembered and partially burned, while J.J.'s body was wrapped in black plastic bags and secured with duct tape.
June 29, 2020 — Police execute another search warrant at the home of Chad Daybell.
July 17, 2020 — Lori Daybell's jury trial was set in Madison County for January 25–29, 2021, on three misdemeanor charges.
August 7, 2020 — It is reported that Chandler, Arizona Police are planning to file a conspiracy to commit murder charge against Lori Daybell for the death of Charles Vallow.
August 21, 2020 — Chad Daybell pleads not guilty to all four of his felony counts against him.

January 2021 to March 2021 
January 11, 2021 — Chad Daybell's trial was scheduled to begin.
January 25–29, 2021 — Lori Vallow's trial for the misdemeanor charges was scheduled to begin.
February 4, 2021 — Prosecutor Lindsey Blake takes over the Fremont County case involving Tamara Daybell's death.
March 22, 2021 — Scheduled court date for Lori Vallow and Chad Daybell. Their cases have been merged and their team has moved to dismiss the charges and obtain a change of venue.

May 2021 to August 2021 
May 25, 2021 — Lori Vallow and Chad Daybell are charged with the murders of Tamara Daybell, Tylee Ryan, and JJ Vallow.
May 27, 2021 — Lori Vallow is deemed incompetent and unfit to stand trial. Due to this, there is a stay in her case in Idaho.
June 29, 2021 — Lori Vallow is indicted by Arizona grand jury on conspiracy to murder her husband Charles Vallow.
July 29, 2021 — Prosecution drops charges for counts of conspiracy to destroy, alter, or conceal evidence against Chad Daybell and Lori Vallow.
August 5, 2021 — Prosecution announces they are seeking the death penalty for Chad Daybell.
August 6, 2021 — James Archibald, a death-penalty-certified attorney, is appointed as co-counsel for Lori Vallow.
August 26, 2021 — Chad Daybell waives his right to a speedy trial.
August 30, 2021 — Lori Vallow still found to be incompetent, due to incomplete status update from mental health facility. Another hearing set for September 8, 2021. On the same day, Chad Daybell had a closed hearing.

September 2021 to December 2021 
September 8, 2021 — Judge Boyce found Lori Vallow to still be incompetent based on the progress report from the mental health facility. She was given another 180 days to attain competence.
October 8, 2021 — Judge grants Chad Daybell's request for a change of venue.
December 28, 2021 — Judge removes Mark Means from Lori Vallow's defense team because there is a conflict of interest relating to having previously represented her husband Chad Daybell.

March 2022 to June 2022 
March 3, 2022 — Prosecutors in Arizona announce that they will not file conspiracy to commit murder charges against Chad Daybell in the attempted shooting case of Brandon Boudreaux.
March 21, 2022 — Judge denied Chad Daybell's request to separate his case from Lori Vallow's case.
April 11, 2022 — Judge Boyce declares that Lori Vallow is now competent to stand trial. She was released from the mental health facility into the custody of the Fremont County Sherriff.
April 19, 2022 — Lori Vallow is arraigned. She was silent as her lawyers put in a plea of not guilty for her. The trial was set for October 11, 2022 to December 16, 2022.
April 28, 2022 — Judge Boyce denied request from Chad Daybell's attorney to drop his charges. The judge also denies a request from prosecutors to have a jury transported from Ada County to Fremont County for the trial and re-affirms that the trial will happen in Ada County.
May 2, 2022 — The prosecution announced that they will be seeking the death penalty for Lori Vallow, asserting that she qualifies for capital punishment because the killings were exceptionally depraved and financially motivated.
May 26, 2022 — The start date of Lori Vallow's trial was changed from October 11, 2022 to January 9, 2023. This was to make sure that she and Chad Daybell will be tried together.

July 2022 to present 
July 15, 2022 — Lori Vallow’s attorneys ask Judge Steven Boyce to clarify language in charges, separating potentially joined counts.
September 28, 2022 — Chad Daybell's lawyers again ask for his case to be separated from that of his wife, Lori Vallow. His lawyers also asked that the trial be pushed back to the fall of 2023.
September 29, 2022 — For the second time, Lori Vallow's trial has been suspended due to competency concerns. There has been no new trial date set.
November 15, 2022 — District Judge Steven Boyce ruled that Lori Vallow was competent and fit to stand trial. A new trial has not been scheduled. Because of the second ruling of incompetence, the January 2023 trial date was canceled.
December 8, 2022 — New trial date has been set for April 3, 2023.
March 3, 2023 — Judge has severed the case of Chad Daybell and Lori Vallow.

See also
 List of solved missing person cases: post-2000
 List of unsolved deaths

Notes

References

External links
Leland Charles Anthony Vallow obituary, legacy.com; accessed July 2, 2020.
Dateline: Where Are the Children? "Keith Morrison previews Dateline special on Daybell case that is ‘nothing like anything else’ he’s ever seen" Nate Eaton, East Idaho News, February 13, 2020.

2010s missing person cases
Missing person cases in Idaho
September 2019 crimes in the United States
2019 in Idaho
Formerly missing people
People murdered in Idaho